Bad Khvoreh (also Romanized as Bād Khvoreh and Badkhowreh) is a village in Seyyed Jamal ol Din Rural District, in the Central District of Asadabad County, Hamadan Province, Iran. At the 2016 census, its population was 2,019, in 550 families.

References 

Populated places in Asadabad County